Federal Highway 49 ( La Carretera Federal 49 )  (Fed. 49) is a free (libre) part of the federal highways corridors of Mexico. The highway runs northwest-southeast in the western regions of the Mexican Plateau.

Fed. 49 has two separate improved segments: The first segment runs from Ciudad Jiménez, Chihuahua to just northwest of Fresnillo, Zacatecas. The highway is co-signed with Fed. 40 for 104.6 km (65 mi) from Gómez Palacio to Cuencamé.

The second segment runs from Las Arcinas, Zacatecas to San Luis Potosí, San Luis Potosí.

References

049
Transportation in Chihuahua (state)
Transportation in Zacatecas
1049
1049